The Colony is a reality television program in which two modern families from Britain and Ireland try to survive in the conditions of New South Wales, Australia, 200 years ago, when it was a penal colony (of the period 1795 to 1815). Together with an Australian family and Aboriginal Australians, they learn just how tough you needed to be to survive.

The series was nominated for the "Most Outstanding Documentary or Documentary Series" in the Logie Awards of 2006.

Cast

the English
John Stephenson (41)
Liz Stephenson (37)	
Carina Stephenson (16)	
Tyler Stephenson (12)

the Irish
Maurice Hurley (48)	
Patricia Hurley (45)	
Susan Hurley (18)	
Declan Hurley (18)	
Deirdre Hurley (14)	
Kate Hurley (10)

the Australians
Kerry Hohnke (42)	
Tracy Hohnke (37)	
Kashire Hohnke (15)	
Eli Hohnkes (9)	
Linkan Hohnke (5)	
Jakob Hohnke (12)

Aboriginal families
Anto Donovan	
Lorna Donovan	
Amber Donovan (9)	
Sharon Costelloe	
Clayton Costelloe (30)	
Kim Costelloe (20)	
Luana Walker (16)	
Jahlow Walker (15)

References

External links
 

2000s Australian reality television series
2005 Australian television series debuts
Special Broadcasting Service original programming
Television shows set in colonial Australia
Historical reality television series
Works about survival skills